25 km/h is a 2018 German road movie directed by Markus Goller.

Synopsis
After the death of their father, two estranged brothers embark on a road trip through Germany on mopeds that they planned when they were kids.

Cast and characters
 Bjarne Mädel as Georg Schneider
 Lars Eidinger as Kristian Schneider
 Sandra Hüller as Tanja
 Franka Potente as Ute
 Alexandra Maria Lara as Ingrid
 Jella Haase as Willie
 Jördis Triebel as Lisa
 Wotan Wilke Möhring as Hantel
  as Konrad
 Mateusz Kościukiewicz as Adam

References

External links
 

2010s drama road movies
German drama road movies
2010s German-language films
2010s German films